Brigadier-General Edward William David Baird  (29 June 1864 – 8 August 1956), known as Ned Baird, was a cavalry officer in the regular British Army and the reserve Territorial Force. Following service in the army, he became a successful horse trainer, winning the Grand National and the St. Leger. He was also a steward at the Jockey Club, a Deputy Lieutenant and a Justice of the Peace.

History
Born in 1864, Edward William David Baird attended Eton College before deciding to join the British Army in February 1885. Firstly in the 3rd (Prince of Wales's) Dragoon Guards but soon after transferred to the, junior but more socially prestigious, 10th (Prince of Wales's Own) Royal Hussars. He resigned his regular commission in February 1892.

In November 1896 Baird joined the Duke of Yorks Own Loyal Suffolk Hussars as a major. The Suffolk Hussars was a Yeomanry regiment, part of the reserve army. It was as a major that he was seconded for active service with the Imperial Yeomanry, in January 1900, during the Second Boer War. He was mentioned in despatches (29 November 1900) by Lord Roberts, Commander-in-Chief during the early part of the War. The following year, 1901, he was promoted to lieutenant-colonel and given command of the Suffolk Hussars. After his five years he retired from the reserve in December 1906,
and was given the honorary rank of colonel in January 1907.

Having first registered his racing colours in 1887, he became a very successful
horse trainer. His horse Playfair winning the 1888 Grand National, that was followed in 1907 when his horse Wool Winder won the St. Leger Stakes, and just missed out on winning The Derby. As a race horse owner he joined the Jockey Club, remaining a member for sixty-two years, and acted as a steward between 1904 and 1906.

During the First World War he was recalled to the army, in October 1914, and eventually given command of the 179th (2/4th London) Brigade, part of the 60th (2/2nd London) Division. He was promoted to brigadier-general in May 1916. That November the division was warned for service overseas in the Salonika Campaign. But Baird now aged fifty-two was deemed too old for active service as a brigade commander and was replaced shortly afterwards. He was instead given command of the Welsh Reserve Brigade, in January 1917 until May 1918 when he finally retired from the army. His service was recognised in the victory honours list being invested as a Commander of The Most Excellent Order of the British Empire. He was appointed a deputy lieutenant of Caithness on 30 July 1920.

He married twice, first in 1893 to Millicent Clarke, by whom he had four sons and three daughters. She died in 1936. Post war Baird married Helen Cicely Kerr, in April 1939. The family lived at Kelloe House, Berwickshire in Scotland, and Baird became a Justice of the Peace until he died 8 August 1956.

References

1864 births
1956 deaths
British Army cavalry generals of World War I
3rd Dragoon Guards officers
10th Royal Hussars officers
British Army personnel of the Second Boer War
Suffolk Yeomanry officers
English justices of the peace
Deputy Lieutenants of Caithness